Dilli Wali Thakur Gurls is an Indian television series based on the 2013 novel Those Pricey Thakur Girls by Anuja Chauhan. It aired from 30 March 2015 to 23 October 2015 on &TV. The show stars Sukirti Kandpal and Aamir Ali. The show is set against the backdrop of Delhi and the story revolves around five siblings who are alphabetically named and very different from each other.

Plot
The story is about the family of Justice LN Thakur, his wife Mamta and their five eccentric daughters: Anji, Binni, Daboo, Chandu, and Eshu. Famous for their shenanigans and popular with the boy brigade, each of the Thakur girls has her style, personality and charm.

The story revolves around how the girls manage to woo everyone around them and conquer the world as they see it. It's fresh insight.

Cast

Main Cast
 Sukirti Kandpal as Debjani "Daboo" Thakur Shekhawat – Mamta and Laxminarayan's third daughter; Anji, Binni, Chandi and Eshu's sister; Dylan's wife
 Aamir Ali as Dylan Singh Shekhawat – Juliet's younger son; Abhimanyu's brother; Daboo's husband 
 Monica Sharma as Chandralekha "Chandi" Thakur – Mamta and Laxminarayan's fourth daughter; Anji, Binni, Daboo and Eshu's sister
 Angad Hasija as Rajbeer – Chandi's love interest
 Sara Khan as Anjini "Anji" Thakur – Mamta and Laxminarayan's eldest daughter; Binni, Daboo, Chandi and Eshu's sister; Anant's wife
 Shilpa Raizada as Binodini "Binni" Thakur – Mamta and Laxminarayan's second daughter; Anji, Daboo, Chandi and Eshu's sister; Vicky's wife
 Meera Deosthale as Eshwari "Eshu" Thakur – Mamta and Laxminarayan's youngest daughter; Anji, Binni, Daboo and Chandi's sister

Recurring Cast
 Anang Desai as Justice Laxminarayan Thakur – Mamta's husband; Anji, Binni, Daboo, Chandi and Eshu's father
 Supriya Pilgaonkar as Mamta Laxminarayan Thakur – Justice's wife; Anji, Binni, Daboo, Chandi and Eshu's mother
 Ashu Sharma as Vicky – Aseem's brother; Binni's husband
 Wasim Mushtaq as Aseem – Vicky's brother; Dylan's employee
 Sheela Sharma as Bhu Devi – Thakurs' neighbor 
 Simple Kaul as Neha 
 Kunika as Mrs. Juliet Shekhwat – Abhimanyu and Dylan's mother
 Sanjay Gagnani as Abhimanyu Shekhawat – Juliet's elder son; Dylan's brother
 Poonampreet Bhatia as Sunaina
 Abhinav Kapoor as Aman
 Vikram Sahu as Mr. Shekhawat
 Sapna Thakur as Kajal Oberoi

References

External links
 Dilli Wali Thakur Gurls on IMDb

&TV original programming
Television shows set in Delhi
2015 Indian television series debuts
2015 Indian television series endings
Television shows based on Indian novels